The Macchi M.33 was an Italian racing flying boat which competed in the 1925 Schneider Trophy race.

Design and development
The Macchi M.33 was a single-seat, wooden, shoulder-wing monoplane flying boat of very clean aerodynamic design for its time. Its cantilever wing was fairly thick and carried stabilizing floats on each side. Italy lacked competitive racing engines in 1925, so the M.33 was powered with a used 1923 Curtiss D-12 engine rated at 378 kilowatts (507 horsepower) in a streamlined nacelle mounted on struts above the fuselage and driving a two-bladed tractor propeller. The M.33 had a flat-plate radiator, a type that was obsolescent by 1925, rather than modern surface radiators.

The D-12 engines powering M.33s were worn-out and unreliable and lacked the power of newer foreign engines, and pilots reported that the aircraft suffered from wing flutter.

Operational history

Despite the M.33s shortcomings, Italy entered two of them in the 1925 Schneider Trophy race hosted by the United States at Baltimore, Maryland. The one piloted by Riccardo Morselli was scratched from the race because of engine ignition problems. Giovanni de Briganti piloted the other M.33; during the race he did not use full throttle out of fear for his aircrafts engine and wing problems, and was further delayed by a navigational error he made during the second lap of the seven-lap race. He came in third with an average speed of 271 kilometers per hour (168 miles per hour); this was well behind the second-place finisher, a British Gloster IIIA piloted by Hubert Broad which finished with an average speed of 321 kilometers per hour (199 miles per hour), and also behind the winner, an American Curtiss R3C-2 piloted by Jimmy Doolittle (1896-1993), which finished with an average speed of 374 kilometers per hour (233 miles per hour).

De Brigantis M.33 was the last flying boat to compete in the Schneider Trophy races.

Specifications

See also

References

Bibliography

M.33
Schneider Trophy
Flying boats
1920s Italian sport aircraft
Racing aircraft
High-wing aircraft
Single-engined tractor aircraft
Aircraft first flown in 1925